Hisham III was the last Umayyad ruler in the Al-Andalus (Arab Iberia) (1026–1031), and the last person to hold the title Caliph of Córdoba.

Hisham III, the brother of Abd ar-Rahman IV, was chosen as Caliph after long negotiations between the governors of the border regions and the people of Córdoba. He could not enter Córdoba until 1029 as the city was occupied by the Berber armies of the Hammudids.

Although he tried to consolidate the Caliphate, the raising of taxes (to pay for mosques amongst other things) led to heavy opposition from the Muslim clerics. After the murder of his Vizier al-Hakam by a conspiracy of Cordoban Patricians, Hisham was imprisoned. He managed to escape, but died in exile in 1036 in Balaguer.

After the Caliphate fell with the overthrow of Hisham III in 1031, the Caliphate's land holdings—already much diminished from its height in power just 100 years past—devolved into a number of militarily weak but culturally advanced taifas.

External links

Umayyad caliphs of Córdoba
11th-century caliphs of Córdoba
973 births
1036 deaths